Lars Sverkeson Romundstad (12 September 1885 – 30 June 1961) was a Norwegian politician for the Farmers' Party.

He was elected to the Parliament of Norway from Møre in 1928, and was re-elected on four occasions.

Romundstad was born in Straumsnes and a member of Straumsnes municipality council from 1919 to 1934, serving the terms 1922–1925, 1925–1928 and 1931–1934 as mayor.

References

1885 births
1961 deaths
Members of the Storting
Centre Party (Norway) politicians
20th-century Norwegian politicians